Mongol Daguur Biosphere Reserve is a nature reserve in the Dornod Aimag (Province) in eastern Mongolia, preserved as an example of one of the largest areas of intact grassland in the world. Together with Ugtam Nature refuge and Daursky Nature Reserve in Russia it constitutes a World Heritage Site named "The Landscapes of Dauria".

History
Mongol Daguur was declared a biosphere reserve by UNESCO in 2005. A biosphere reserve aims to preserve the environment while allowing local communities to be involved in sustainable development. The core area of a biosphere reserve is strictly protected, the buffer zone is used for research and similar activities, and the transition zone allows the local communities to undertake ecologically sustainable activities.

Description

Habitats present include temperate steppe, rocky outcrops, sand dunes and marshes.

The reserve is divided into two areas. The larger, northern area lies alongside a protected area in Russia, the Daursky Nature Reserve. It lies to the south of Lake Barun-Torey and consists of grass steppes and some wetlands. The smaller, southern area consists of the Ulz River basin and associated wetlands. This area is home to the rare white-naped crane (Grus vipio) and other species of crane. The core zone is designated as a Special Protected area and is managed for the conservation of the herds of Mongolian gazelle (Procapra gutturosa). The transition areas are used for sustainable tourism, and for grazing livestock, the culling of wildlife as necessary, forest maintenance, and the gathering of medicinal plants for household use by the pastoral population of about 11,800 residents.

References

Nature reserves in Mongolia